Eberhard Reschwamm (born 26 March 1940) is a German sailor. He competed in the Flying Dutchman event at the 1964 Summer Olympics.

References

External links
 

1940 births
Living people
German male sailors (sport)
Olympic sailors of the United Team of Germany
Sailors at the 1964 Summer Olympics – Flying Dutchman
People from Dobrich Province